The 1913 All-Ireland Senior Football Championship Final was the 26th All-Ireland Final and the deciding match of the 1913 All-Ireland Senior Football Championship, an inter-county Gaelic football tournament for the top teams in Ireland.

Match

Summary
Kerry won with captain Dick Fitzgerald scoring 1–2 and Johnny Skinner scoring 1–0, with "Aeroplane" O'Shea as their star.

This was also the first Championship meeting of Kerry and Wexford.

Details

References

Gaelic football
All-Ireland Senior Football Championship Finals
Kerry county football team matches
Wexford county football team matches